The Fargo and Southern Depot is a historic railroad station in Fargo, North Dakota, United States.  It was built in 1884 by the Fargo and Southern Railway.

The Fargo and Southern Railway was a combined effort of 23 Fargo businesses to build a railroad from Fargo to the Milwaukee Road at Ortonville, Minnesota. The first train ran on July 2, 1884, with the depot opening later that year. In time, the Fargo and Southern was sold to the Milwaukee Road. Passenger trains serviced the depot until December 31, 1931. The depot continued to see mixed train service until that too ended on October 31, 1956.

The depot was listed on the National Register of Historic Places in 1975 as the Fargo and Southern Depot, and delisted in 1980 after a fire in December 1974 severely damaged the building leading to its demolition.

References

Railway stations in the United States opened in 1884
Railway stations on the National Register of Historic Places in North Dakota
Former Chicago, Milwaukee, St. Paul and Pacific Railroad stations
National Register of Historic Places in Cass County, North Dakota
Former National Register of Historic Places in North Dakota
Former railway stations in North Dakota
Transportation in Cass County, North Dakota
1884 establishments in Dakota Territory